is a former Japanese footballer who last played for FC Ryukyu.

Club statistics
Updated to 23 February 2018.

References

External links

Profile at FC Ryukyu

1991 births
Living people
Sapporo University alumni
Association football people from Hokkaido
Japanese footballers
J3 League players
FC Ryukyu players
FC Ganju Iwate players
Association football defenders